A Spirit in Prison is a 1908 dramatic romance novel by the British writer Robert Hichens. It was inspired by time Hichens had spent in Sicily while writing his bestseller The Garden of Allah.

References

Bibliography
 Vinson, James. Twentieth-Century Romance and Gothic Writers. Macmillan, 1982.

1908 British novels
Novels by Robert Hichens 
Novels set in Italy